The pine warbler (Setophaga pinus) is a small songbird of the New World warbler family.

Description 
These birds have white bellies, two white wing bars, dark legs and thin, relatively long pointed bills; they have yellowish 'spectacles' around their eyes. Adult males have olive upperparts and bright yellow throats and breasts; females and immatures display upperparts which are olive-brown. Their throats and breasts are paler. The adult male pine warbler looks somewhat similar to the yellow-throated vireo which may cause some identification problems.

The song of this bird is a musical trill. Their calls are slurred chips.

Distribution and habitat 

Their breeding habitats are open pine woods in eastern North America. These birds are permanent residents in southern Florida. Some of them, however, migrate to northeastern Mexico and islands in Bermuda and the Caribbean. The first record for South America was a vagrant wintering female seen at Vista Nieve, Colombia, on 20 November 2002; this bird was foraging as part of a mixed-species feeding flock that also included wintering Blackburnian and Tennessee warblers.

Behavior 
They forage slowly on tree trunks and branches by poking their bill into pine cones. These birds also find food by searching for it on the ground. These birds mainly eat insects, seeds and berries.

Their nests are deep, open cups, which are placed near the end of a tree branch. Pine warblers prefer to nest in pine trees, hence their names. Three to five blotched white eggs are laid.

References

External links

 
 Pine warbler - Dendroica pinus - USGS Patuxent Bird Identification InfoCenter
 Pine warbler species account - Cornell Lab of Ornithology
 Pine warbler bird sound at Florida Museum of Natural History
 
 
 

pine warbler
Native birds of Eastern Canada
Native birds of the Eastern United States
Birds of the Bahamas
Birds of Hispaniola
Birds of the Dominican Republic
pine warbler